Wulihe Stadium was a multi-purpose stadium in Shenyang, China.

The stadium had a capacity of 65,000 people and was built in 1989. It was used mostly for football matches. The opening match took place in August 1989 when Santos beat Liaoning 1–0.

It was the home stadium of Shenyang Ginde football team. It was the site of the Chinese National Team's clinching a spot for the 2002 FIFA World Cup Finals when they defeated Oman 1–0 to claim a spot for the finals in South Korea. It was demolished on 12 February 2007 after 18 years of usage to make way for a shopping mall. A new Shenyang Olympic Sports Center Stadium was constructed in 2007 to host some of the football matches for the Beijing Olympics in 2008 and replace this stadium.

See also
Shenyang Olympic Sports Center Stadium

References

Buildings and structures in Shenyang
Defunct football venues in China
Sport in Shenyang
Multi-purpose stadiums in China
Defunct sports venues in China
Sports venues in Liaoning
Sports venues demolished in 2007
Demolished buildings and structures in China